Max Landesberg (1840 – 4 March 1895) was a Romanian physician and occulist.

He was born to a Jewish family in Iași in 1840. He was educated at the gymnasium at Ratibor and at the University of Berlin (M.D. 1865). After a postgraduate course under Graefe, Landesberg went to the United States, where he practised in New York and Philadelphia. He was the American editor of the Revue d'Ophthalmologie of Paris. 

In 1894, he moved to Florence, Italy, dying there the next year.

Publications

References
 

1840 births
1895 deaths
People from Iași
19th-century occultists
19th-century Romanian Jews
Humboldt University of Berlin alumni
Jewish physicians
Romanian emigrants to the United States
Romanian medical writers
Romanian occultists